Al-Khader Stadium is an international football stadium in the Palestinian town of al-Khader near Bethlehem. It was inaugurated on August 6, 2007
with a match between local team Shabab Al-Khadr, and Maccabi Ahi Nazareth, an Israeli Arab team from Nazareth. The stadium was constructed with funding from Portugal through the Portuguese Institute for Cooperation for Development. Al-Khader Stadium cost roughly $2 million to build and could host over 6,000 spectators. It is the home stadium of Shabab Al-Khadr. In addition to football, the stadium hosts the annual al-Khader Festival of Arts and Culture and the grape festival of the town.

References

Buildings and structures in the West Bank
Football venues in the State of Palestine
Al-Khader
Sports venues completed in 2007